SRV may refer to:

Computing
SRV record as used in the Domain Name System
/srv, a directory on Unix-like computer systems

Music
Stevie Ray Vaughan, American blues and blues-rock guitarist (1954–1990)
"S.R.V.", an instrumental track from guitarist Eric Johnson's 1996 album Venus Isle

Government
Statens Räddningsverk, Rescue Services Agency (Sweden)

Vehicles
Cirrus Design SRV, a budget Cirrus SR20 aircraft
Vauxhall SRV, a 1970 concept automobile
Submarine Rescue Vessel
SRV Dominator, a stormchasing automobile
Special Reconnaissance Vehicle of the Irish Army Ranger Wing

Other uses
Safety relief valve
Social role valorization
Simian retrovirus, a betaretrovirus
Stony River, Alaska, airport, US, IATA code
 Score Runoff Voting, later named STAR voting
 Socialist Republic of Vietnam, official name of Vietnam